Monochroa moyses is a moth of the family Gelechiidae. It was described by Uffen in 1991. It is found in Portugal, Great Britain, Belgium and the Netherlands.

The larvae feed on Scirpus maritimus and possibly Scirpus sylvaticus. They mine the leaves of their host plant. The larvae have a pinkish white body and light brown head.

References

Moths described in 1991
Monochroa